Breacker is a surname. Notable people with the surname include:

Adrian Breacker (born 1934), English athlete
Tim Breacker (born 1965), English footballer and manager